Bradford Leigh is a hamlet in Wiltshire, England.

The area was formerly a tithing of the parish of Bradford on Avon. A Methodist chapel was built in 1892, belonging to the Methodist church at Bradford on Avon; the chapel closed in the mid-20th century.

The local pub, the Plough, closed in 2014 and was offered for sale in 2015.

References

External links

Hamlets in Wiltshire